The Battle of Middle Boggy, also known as the 'Battle of Middle Boggy River or Battle of Middle Boggy Depot, took place on February 13, 1864 in Choctaw Indian Territory,  south of what is now Allen in Pontotoc County, Oklahoma. Advancing down the Dragoon Trail toward Fort Washita, Union Colonel William A. Phillips sent out an advance of approximately 350 men from the 14th Kansas Cavalry (led by Maj. Charles Willetts) and two howitzers (led by Captain Solomon Kaufman) to attack a Confederate outpost guarding the Trail's crossing of Middle Boggy River. The Confederate force was led by Captain Jonathan Nail and composed of one company of the First Choctaw and Chickasaw Cavalry, a detachment of the 20th Texas Cavalry and part of the Seminole Battalion of Mounted Rifles. The Encyclopedia of Oklahoma History and Culture says that the battlefield was 15 miles northeast of the depot, whereas the battlefield marker says the distance was 12 miles. The Confederate force at the outpost, consisting of 90 poorly armed men, were caught off guard when Willetts attacked them. Outnumbered and outgunned, the Confederates held off the Union cavalry attack for approximately 30 minutes before retreating to the rest of Lt. Col. John Jumper's Seminole Battalion, who were not at the main skirmish. The Union advance continued south toward Ft. Washita the next day, but when the expected reinforcements did not arrive Philips' Expedition into Indian Territory stalled on February 15, near old Stonewall.

Background
Union Colonel William A Phillips led an expedition consisting of about 1,500 soldiers to divide the Confederate forces in Indian Territory along a line from Fort Gibson to the Red River. The force represented three companies of the 14th Kansas Cavalry, a battalion of Kansas Infantry and two regiments of the Indian Home Guard, supported by howitzers from the 3rd Regiment of the Indian Home Guards. The expedition had four objectives: (1) establish Union Control over the Indian Territory, (2) offer amnesty to the Creek, Seminole, and Chickasaw Indians provided in President Lincoln's Emancipation Proclamation  of December 1863; sever Confederate treaties with the tribes and (4) gain new recruits.

Colonel Phillips issued the following message to his troops before they departed from Fort Gibson to begin the expedition:

Circular Hdqrs. First Brig., Army of the Frontier
Fort Gibson, C. N., January 30, 1864

Soldiers! I take you with me to clean out the Indian Nation south of the river and drive away and destroy the rebels. Let me say a few words to you that you are not to forget. Do not begin firing in battle until you are ordered. When you fire, aim low, about the knee, or at the lower part of a man's body, if on horseback. Never fire in the air. Fire slowly and never until you see something to shout at that you may hit. Do not waste your ammunition. Do not straggle or go away from the command; it is cowards only that leave their comrades in the face of the enemy; nearly all the men we get killed are stragglers. Keep with me close and obey orders and we will soon have peace. Those who are still in arms are rebels, who ought to die. Do not kill a prisoner after he has surrendered. But I do not ask you to take prisoners. I ask you to make your footsteps severe and terrible.

Muscogees! the time has now come when you are to remember the authors of all your sufferings; those who started a needless and wicked war, who drove you from your homes, who robbed you of your property. Stand by me faithfully and we will soon have peace. Watch over each other to keep each other right, and be ready to strike a terrible blow on those who murdered your wives and little ones by the Red Fork along the Verdigris or by Dave Farm Cowpens. Do not be afraid. We have always beaten them. We will surely win. May God go with us.

Wm. A. Phillips

Colonel, Commanding

Phillips' expedition left Fort Gibson on February 1, 1864 and moved southwest along the Dragoon Trail toward Fort Washita. This trail  (also called the Texas Cattle Trail), roughly parallelled the more heavily used Texas Road. Phillips chose this route because guerilla warfare had decimated the area along the Texas Road, and Phillips believed that there would be better forage along the Dragoon route.  He stopped on February 4, to await the arrival of the remaining nine companies of the 14th Kansas Cavalry. On February 11, Phillips paused near Edwards' Post, south of the Canadian River, and awaited the arrival of reinforcements from Fort Smith. When the reinforcements failed to arrive, Phillips decided to proceed to the Middle Boggy, a tributary of the Red River.

Skirmish at the outpost
The Confederate outpost was very near the point where the Dragoon Road crossed the Middle Boggy. Maj. Willetts' advance group camped a short distance away on the night of February 12 and made final preparations to attack. Willett's group began the skirmish with an artillery barrage at 7 A.M. the following morning. The 14th Kansas Cavalry immediately charged, throwing the Confederates into confusion.

Some of the surviving members of Capt. Nail's command retreated to Boggy Depot, abandoning the wounded on the battlefield. The rest of the Chickasaw Battalion remained near Cochran to escort Chickasaw Governor Winchester Colbert's family from Pontotoc to Tishomingo. General Douglas H. Cooper, who had returned that night to his headquarters at Boggy Depot from Fort Washita, had sent a request to Texas for more reinforcements. A Confederate burial detail sent to the battlefield found all the abandoned wounded had been killed with their throats cut. Col. Phillips reported that his soldiers had killed 48 Confederate soldiers and had taken no prisoners. BG Cooper reported that only 11 Confederate soldiers were killed.

Aftermath
Col. Phillips camped at a site called Camp Kansas on the night after the battle. By now, he knew that the remainder of the 14th Cavalry would not be coming to his assistance. The next day, Phillips divided his command into two groups. He sent the cavalry soldiers south  under Major Willetts in pursuit of the fleeing Confederates and seeking Gov. Colbert. He ordered Colonel Wattles to take command of the infantry and proceed to old Fort Holmes.

On February 15, Phillips ordered his troops to burn Pontotoc Court House and all the Confederate and Chickasaw buildings in the town of Cochran. He also ordered the destruction of Colbert Institute, a pre-war Chickasaw school that had been used to house Confederate troops.

The battle was a defeat for the Confederates. However, the mistreatment of civilians and killings of wounded soldiers by the Union troops strengthened the resolve of Confederates and their sympathizers to continue the fight.

The Atoka County Historical Society celebrates the Battle of Middle Boggy with a reenactment every third year.

Cemetery
A cemetery, now called the Confederate Cemetery near Atoka, was established along the Butterfield Stage road before the Civil War. Local residents believed that the people buried here were all soldiers who had died during the Battle of Middle Boggy. However, forensic research in 1988 enabled site manager Gwen Walker to positively identify some of the victims as soldiers of the 19th Arkansas Infantry.  Walker discovered that these men had been sent to construct earthworks at Fort McCulloch in 1862, and that they had died of an epidemic of measles.

Battlefield marker
The marker was replaced with a new and different marker in 2014. It now reads:

"MIDDLE BOGGY BATTLE

ON THIS SITE LIE CONFEDERATE SOLDIERS WHO DIED IN BATTLE, FEBRUARY 13, 1864

"The Confederate encampment here at Middle (or Muddy) Boggy Crossing on the Boggy Depot Road held by Lt. Col. John Jumper's Seminole Battalion, Capt. Adam Nail's Company "A" of First Choctaw and Chickasaw Cavalry, and a detachment of the Twentieth Texas Regiment was suddenly attacked by Federal Forces --- 3 companies of Fourteenth Kansas Cavalry, Maj. Charles Willetts in command, and a section of howitzers under Capt. Solomon Kaufman.

The Confederates, though poorly armed, made a firm stand in a hot fight of 30 minutes in which 47 of their men were killed and others wounded. Word of Confederate forces riding in from Boggy Depot, 12 miles southwest, caused a hurried retreat of the Federal troops toward Fort Gibson, north. The dead were buried 1 mile north of Atoka, Oklahoma on the west side of Boggy River, and 100 yards north of Hwy. 69. This cemetery was also a burial ground for travelers on the old Boggy Depot Road before the Civil War."

See also

 List of battles fought in Oklahoma

Notes

References

National Park Service battle description
CWSAC Report Update and Resurvey: Individual Battlefield Profiles

External links
Battle of Middle Boggy

Battles of the American Civil War in Indian Territory
Pontotoc County, Oklahoma
Battles of the Trans-Mississippi Theater of the American Civil War
Union victories of the American Civil War
Operations to control Indian Territory (American Civil War)
February 1864 events
1864 in Indian Territory